Ion Enache (born 21 February 1947) is a Romanian former wrestler who competed in the 1968 Summer Olympics and in the 1976 Summer Olympics. Enache is also a former rugby union player who played at centre and made one appearance for the Romania national rugby union team in 1977 in a 1977–78 FIRA Trophy match against Italy—a 10–10 draw.

References

External links 
 

1947 births
Living people
Olympic wrestlers of Romania
Wrestlers at the 1968 Summer Olympics
Wrestlers at the 1976 Summer Olympics
Romanian male sport wrestlers
Romanian rugby union players
Romania international rugby union players
Rugby union centres
Sportspeople from Ploiești
20th-century Romanian people
World Wrestling Championships medalists